is a 2003 Japanese film directed by Yoshimitsu Morita. At the 27th Japan Academy Prize it won three awards and received ten other nominations. The film is a remake of the  TV mini series Ashura no Gotoku on NHK.

Synopsis 
The film follows four sisters who discover that their elderly father is having an affair. When a letter is published in the newspaper detailing the affair, they try to hide it from their mother, while suspecting each other of having written it.

Cast 
 Shinobu Otake
 Eri Fukatsu
 Kaoru Yachigusa
 Shidou Nakamura

Awards and nominations 
27th Japan Academy Prize. 
Won: Best Director - Yoshimitsu Morita
Won: Best Screenplay - Tomomi Tsutsui
Won: Best Actress in a Supporting Role - Eri Fukatsu
Nominated: Best Picture
Nominated: Best Actress - Shinobu Otake
Nominated: Best Actress in a Supporting Role - Kaoru Yachigusa
Nominated: Best Actor in a Supporting Role - Shidou Nakamura
Nominated: Best Music - Michiru Oshima
Nominated: Best Cinematography - Nobuyasu Kita
Nominated: Best Lighting Direction - Koichi Watanabe
Nominated: Best Art Direction - Hidemitsu Yamasaki
Nominated: Best Sound Recording - Fumio Hashimoto
Nominated: Best Film Editing - Shinji Tanaka

References

External links 
 

2003 films
Films directed by Yoshimitsu Morita
2000s Japanese-language films
Films scored by Michiru Ōshima
2000s Japanese films